"Hail! Minnesota" (also simply called "Minnesota" in early years) is the regional anthem (or "state song") of the U.S. state of Minnesota. A variation is used as a school song of the University of Minnesota.  It originated at the university in the early 20th century when some students decided to honor their graduating class with a new song.  In 1945, the Minnesota State Legislature approved the tune as the state song.

History
The song was first composed by Truman Rickard in 1904 and was performed on May 28, Class Day.  The song's second verse originally honored the school's president, Cyrus Northrop, who went by the nickname "Prexy".  Northrop appreciated the gesture but preferred to have the song reflect the school and state rather than himself.  A new second verse was written by Arthur Upson, an editor at the campus newspaper, the Minnesota Daily.

In the next few years, the song gained popularity and was even sung at football games whenever there was a touchdown.  However, the slow ballad proved to be incongruous with the atmosphere at an athletic event like that, so it was eventually succeeded in that role by The "Minnesota Rouser."  Rickard also went on to write another school song, "Minnesota Fight."

The University of Minnesota Marching Band sings the song at the end of every practice and performance, so Golden Gopher football fans who stay for the band's post-game performance can hear the song. On "Senior Day" (final hockey home game of the season) the Gopher Hockey Pep Band serenades departing seniors after the game.

Older generations of Minnesotan children were taught the song in school, but this practice has waned. However, the song was promoted again as part of the state sesquicentennial celebration in 2008, with the Mahtomedi High School Chamber Singers making an official recording of it in 2006 for the Secretary of State.

Lyrics

State version

University version

(Currently, the second verse is same as the state version, although it originally honored the school's president)

References

External links
 with sheet music and recording.
Hail! Minnesota by the University of Minnesota Marching Band (MP3 recording )

Minnesota culture
Symbols of Minnesota
Minnesota
University of Minnesota
1904 songs
Music of Minnesota
Songs about Minnesota